is a Japanese composer and music producer. He is best known for composing music for several video games in the Silent Hill series by Konami, among other games. Yamaoka also worked as a producer on the series, as well as composing for the Silent Hill film and its sequel. Since 2010, he has been the sound director at Grasshopper Manufacture.

Early life 
Yamaoka attended Tokyo Art College, where he studied product design and interior design. He originally planned to follow a career in design.

Career 
Yamaoka joined Konami on September 21, 1993. He immediately began to work on the games Contra: Hard Corps, Sparkster, and Sparkster: Rocket Knight Adventures 2. Shortly thereafter, he worked on the music for the PC Engine and Sega CD versions of Snatcher. When Konami began searching for a musician to compose Silent Hill'''s score, Yamaoka volunteered because he thought he was the only one capable of making the soundtrack. Although initially hired as a composer, he soon became involved in overall sound design.

On December 2, 2009, it was announced that Yamaoka was leaving his long term employer Konami. On February 3, 2010, it was announced that Yamaoka has joined Grasshopper Manufacture and was working with Goichi Suda and Shinji Mikami on their action game, Shadows of the Damned. He was first appointed to the role of chief sound officer at Grasshopper, but became involved in aspects of game production as well.

On August 10, 2012, Yamaoka announced he would be releasing a second solo album in late 2012, one "different from the usual Silent Hill music." On October 31, 2012, he announced via Facebook, that the new three-track Spanish-language single "Revolución" would premiere at V-CON during a live performance. In 2014, he expressed interest in returning as a composer for Silent Hills, although the project was later cancelled.

In late October and early November 2015, Yamaoka and his band performed tracks from the Silent Hill series at nine live events in cities across the United Kingdom, titled "Silent Hill Live". In July 2016, Yamaoka performed live at the BitSummit 4th indie game festival in Kyoto, Japan.

 Personal life 
Before working as a video game composer, Yamaoka initially sought a career as a designer, but instead became a musician after studying product design at Tokyo Art College.

Yamaoka stated in a 2009 interview that his favorite game creator is Suda51 and his favorite video game is No More Heroes. His favorite of his own soundtracks is Silent Hill 2. In March 2011, Yamaoka auctioned some of his musical instruments for the 2011 Tōhoku earthquake and tsunami Play for Japan flood relief. In a 2014 interview, he stated his favorite film was Dario Argento's Suspiria''. He is married to Ai "Tamu" Murata, who is the drummer of the heavy metal band Nemophila. They have two daughters.

Artistry 
When asked what other artists influenced his work, Yamaoka cited Trent Reznor of Nine Inch Nails as his "main inspiration, both performing and in music style." Among his other influences are Angelo Badalamenti (best known for his soundtrack work with David Lynch), Massive Attack, Metallica and Depeche Mode.

When asked if his studies at Tokyo Art College had helped him in his musical career, he replied: "At that time, Mick Karn of Japan, Steve Strange of Visage, and a lot of other musicians combined the notions of Art and Music with their own new style. I got really influenced by that. Therefore, every time I write songs, I try to combine Art and Music." He has also stated that he derives much of his influence from baroque styles common throughout the 18th century.

Yamaoka stated some of his favorite songs to be "Der Mussolini" by D.A.F., "Amber" by Craig Armstrong, "Moments in Love" by Anne Dudley, "Moon Over Moscow" by Visage, and "The Ecstasy of Gold" by Ennio Morricone.

Works

Video games

Films

Other

References

External links 

 Official website
 Archived Konami blog 
 

1968 births
Ambient composers
Industrial musicians
Japanese film score composers
Japanese male film score composers
Japanese rock guitarists
Konami people
Living people
Musicians from Niigata Prefecture
People from Niigata (city)
Silent Hill
Japanese sound designers
Trip hop musicians
Video game composers